Saga Prefectural Gymnasium is an arena in Saga, Saga, Japan. It is the home arena of the Saga Ballooners of the B.League, Japan's professional basketball league.

Facilities

References

Basketball venues in Japan
Indoor arenas in Japan
Sports venues in Saga Prefecture
Saga (city)
Sports venues completed in 1986
1986 establishments in Japan